The South Coast 21 is an American trailerable sailboat that was designed by Carl Alberg as a daysailer and first built in 1965.

The boat was later developed into the slightly longer, swing keel South Coast 22.

Production
The design was built by South Coast Seacraft in the United States, between 1965 and 1979, with 300 boats completed, but it is now out of production.

The boat was produced complete and ready-to-sail and also as a kit for amateur completion.

Design
The South Coast 21 is a recreational keelboat, built predominantly of fiberglass, with wood trim. The hull has a spooned, raked stem; a raised counter, angled transom, an internally mounted spade-type rudder controlled by a tiller and a fixed fin keel. It displaces  and carries  of ballast.

The boat is normally fitted with a small  outboard motor for docking and maneuvering.

The design has sleeping accommodation for two people, with two straight settee berths in the main cabin. There are no provisions or space for a galley or a head.

The design was changed during production to address issues that became apparent in service. Starting with hull number 91 the keel was moved aft to reduce weather helm. This did not entirely solve the issue and later the rudder was enlarged as well.

Operational history
The boat is supported by an active class club that organizes racing events, the South Coast Seacraft Owners' Association.

In a 2010 review Steve Henkel wrote, "the classic low freeboard, narrow beam, and Star Boat-like underbody appeal to us as being a great combination for daysailing and club one-design racing. But somehow the SC21 never caught on in any big way on the club racing circuit. Too bad. Best features: We imagine the hull configuration gives a good combination of speed and comfort ... Worst features: There is not much space below, even for overnighting—basically a pair of settee berths with almost non-existent (3' 3") headroom, and that's it. No space for a galley or even to store a porta-potti. We'd worry slightly about that rudder tucked away under the counter. Does it have weed dragging us down? If so, we couldn't see it without hanging way over the side, and then only if the water was clear. Launching and retrieving at a ramp might give some trouble because of the relatively deep fin keel. The one cockpit drain is aft on the centerline, rather than the more preferable two drains in the corners, to remove water when the vessel is heeled. And the plan shows a flat cockpit sole; it should be angled downwind aft for drainage."

See also
List of sailing boat types

References

External links
Photo of a South Coast 21, showing the keel and rudder

Keelboats
1960s sailboat type designs
Sailing yachts
Trailer sailers
Sailboat types built in the United States
Sailboat type designs by Carl Alberg
Sailboat types built by South Coast Seacraft